Majdabad-e Kohneh (also Romanized as Majdābād-e Kohneh; also known as Majd Ābād and Mujdābād Kūhneh) is a village in Farmahin Rural District, in the Central District of Farahan County, Markazi Province, Iran. At the 2006 census, its population was 538, in 184 families.

References 

Populated places in Farahan County